Tamar Abakelia (also spelled as Tamara Abakeliya; ; ; 19 August 1905 – 14 May 1953) was a Georgian sculptor, theater designer and illustrator. She was granted the title of Honored Artist of the Georgian SSR in 1942.

Family 

Abakelia's father, Grigol Abakelia, a chief prosecuting officer for the Georgian SSR, and uncle, Ioseb Abakelia, a leading Georgian tuberculosis specialist, were shot during Joseph Stalin's Great Purge in 1938. She was married to a Socialist poet and playwright Karlo Kaladze (1907–1988). She had one son with Kaladze, sculptor Gulda Kaladze.

Biography 

Born in Khoni, Imereti (then part of Kutais Governorate, Russian Empire), Tamar Abakelia graduated from Tbilisi State Academy of Arts in 1929 and taught there beginning in 1938. Among Abakelia's works were graphic illustrations for Nikolay Tikhonov, Shota Rustaveli, David of Sasun, Vazha-Pshavela as well as stage decorations for the Rustaveli and Marjanishvili theaters and costume designs for the films Arsena (1937), Giorgi Saakadze (1942), and David Guramishvili (1945). Many of her achievements were in the field of sculpture. Noted for the dynamism of composition and artistically rounded forms, Abakelia was responsible for much of the progress of Soviet Georgian sculpture. She sculptured friezes on the Museum of Marxism–Leninism in Tbilisi, depicting the various phases of socialist construction in Georgia (1936–37). Abakelia died in Tbilisi in 1953 and was buried there, at the Didube Pantheon.

References 

1905 births
1953 deaths
Soviet painters
People from Khoni
People from Kutais Governorate
Communist Party of the Soviet Union members
Mingrelian women
Soviet sculptors
Recipients of the Order of the Red Banner of Labour
Soviet costume designers
Tbilisi State Academy of Arts alumni
Academic staff of the Tbilisi State Academy of Arts
Burials at Didube Pantheon